Current motor vehicle registrations in Chile are officially known as Placa Patente Única (PPU). This denomination was introduced when unifying the license plate registries at the national level, where each vehicle would carry a unique license plate in the country, in 1985.

Formats

Old format (before December 31, 1984) 

In the first registration system, vehicles were registered in each municipality, and this assigned a record independently, whose combinations were governed by a certain geographical distribution.

The amounts of letters and numbers depend on the era:

These patents carried combinations of letters and numbers. They also wore different colors depending on the type of vehicle, the use it is given or the year. The distribution of information (municipality, combination, year, etc.) on the lines of the plate (upper or lower) also depended on each municipality.

Formats

Old format (before December 31, 1984) 

In the first registration system, vehicles were registered in each municipality, and this assigned a record independently, whose combinations were governed by a certain geographical distribution.

These patents carried combinations of letters and numbers. They also wore different colors depending on the type of vehicle, the use it is given or the year. The distribution of information (municipality, combination, year, etc.) on the lines of the plate (upper or lower) also depended on each municipality.

The amounts of letters and numbers depend on the era:

Grades:
The vertical line / indicates the separation between the upper and lower line.
The separation indicated between the year and the symbol of the Mint is marked in such a way that the first written data is above the second. For example, if it is found as " · [70] " it indicates that the symbol is placed over the year.

 until 1940: Numbers only. Example:
 39 718 / 38 VALPARAISO PR

 1940s and 1950s
 for Santiago: Two letters and two numbers separated by a star, includes the year and type of vehicle. Example:
 BC 98 / 58 SANTIAGO P (Individual)
 for the rest of the country: Two letters and three numbers separated by a star (upper line), includes the year and type of vehicle (lower line). Examples:
 TC 104 / 59 PUNTA ARENAS P (Individual)
 YH 477 / 58 QUILICURA SW (Station wagon)

 1960s
 for Santiago: Two letters and two numbers separated by the symbol of the Casa de Moneda de Chile (S̊) and the year (bottom line). Example
 SANTIAGO WAGONS / CZ ·[62] 85 (Station wagon)
 for the rest of the country: Two letters and three numbers separated by the symbol of the House of Mint of Chile and the year (bottom line). Example:
 FREIRE P / UL · [64] 274 (Individual)

 1970s
 for Santiago: Two letters and two numbers separated by the year and the symbol of the Chilean Mint (top line). Example:
 BG [71] · 51 / SANTIAGO P (Individual)
 for the rest of the country: Two letters and three numbers or three letters and two numbers (without leading zeros), separated by the year and the symbol of the Chilean Mint. examples
 BOD [73] · 37 / PUEBLO HUNDIDO C (Commercial)
 QUILACO P / ULA · [78] 19 (Individual)
 QUIRIHUE A / RBJ · [76] 4 (Taxi)
 RL [75] · 409 / PROVIDENCIA C (Commercial)

 1980s
 for the whole country: Three letters and three numbers separated by the symbol of the House of Mint of Chile. The colors determine the type of vehicle, although they also depend on the year. Example:
 HDU 376 / SANTIAGO 81
 XIC 791 / TEMUCO 81
 GRAL. LAKES 82 / AAA 452
  TJE 813 / TALCA 83
 GVC 629 / RENCA 84

The initial letters between 1981 and 1984 were distributed as follows:

 Regions of Arica and Parinacota, and Tarapacá: A.
 Antofagasta Region: B.
 Regions of Atacama and Coquimbo: C.
 Valparaiso Region: D, E, F.
 Santiago Metropolitan Region: G, H, I, J, K, L, N, O, P, R.
 Libertador General Bernardo O'Higgins Region: S.
 Maule Region: T.
 Ñuble and Bio Bio Regions: U, V.
 Araucanía Region: X.
 Regions of Los Ríos and Los Lagos: Y.
 Regions of Aysén del General Carlos Ibáñez del Campo and Magallanes: Z.

Format AA 10-00 (1985-2007) 

The format consists of two letters and four numbers ('AA·10-00); the letters are separated from the numbers by a simplified figure of the National Coat of Arms, while the numbers are grouped in two pairs of digits separated by a small circle. In addition to the numbers visible on the license plate, the registration additionally incorporates a verifier digit, the one that appears in the vehicle documentation.

The first letter can be one of the following 23 (correlative in the second letter between A and H; correlative in the first letter in D, K, L and following, in order of appearance of the series): A, B, C , E, F, G, H, D, K, L, N, P, R, S, T, U, V, X, Y, Z, W and M. The letter I was not used because of its resemblance to the J, although it was only used with the letter D (remaining as DI.1234), the Ñ because it resembles the N and the Q with the O. There are only patents that begin with the letter O, if the vehicle belongs to a diplomatic representation . Currently, the letter J is used for the national registration of trailers for cargo transportation, which replaced the old registration system with comunas; for its part, the M exists in combinations from MZ to MX (given in reverse order). This combination allowed for a fleet of 5,289,999 vehicles.

The first letter of the square allows to identify the year of the vehicle, although without exact precision and only from the letter D onwards. These years are: 

It is possible to observe vehicles whose plates begin with a letter that does not correspond to their year of registration, which may be because the vehicle was re-registered, or it was registered in an office where so few vehicles are registered that the combinations are delayed. The most common are: 

'CH: Although there are some older vehicles (between 1970 to 1985) that have it, much of this combination was used between the years 1993 and 1997.
BJ: less abundant than the previous letter. From between 27 00 to 30 00
FG: low abundance. From 26 01 to 30 99
CG: low abundance.
HG: low abundance. From 97 00 to 99 99

The second letter can be one of the following 23: A, B, C, D, E, F, G, H, I, J, K, L, N, P, R, S, T, U, V, X , Y, Z and W. M and W were left out for being too wide, Ñ for its resemblance to N, O for its resemblance to zero, and Q for its resemblance to O and zero. The I was only used in the combination DI.

In plates beginning with letters A, B, C, E, F, G and H, the sequential order is expressed in the second letter, for example, the sequential order of the first series was AA - BA - CA - EA, and so on; the next series was AB - CB - EB - FB, and so on. Initially, the letter D was not used at the beginning of the combination, due to its resemblance to zero, and the combinations BB, AD, AK were not used either. AY, GG and HZ, but until much later.

Also in the beginning there was a certain unintentional geographical distribution, some series assigned according to the table, for example: 

The combinations that begin with the letters A, B, C, E, F, G and H, were not issued following a correlative order, unlike what was done from 1990 (D) and until the end of the system. Thus, combinations such as CK and FK are recorded at the same time (until 1984), while other combinations were not issued simultaneously, for example, HN aired in the early 1980s, while FN and GN appeared towards the end of that decade. Some combinations were issued for most of the decade, such as AL, which can be seen on both early 1980s and late 1990s and even 1990s and later vehicles . 

In 1990 plates began to be issued following a correlative order marked on the second letter, beginning with D: DA - DB - DD ( DC was not used), and so on. E, F, G, and H had already been used in the previous system and J had been discarded because it resembled I, so K was continued: KA - KB - KC - KD, etc. This order allows to identify, with moderate precision, the year of registration of the vehicle, for example, the letter S began to be issued from the end of 1997, the letter X corresponds to the middle of 2003, etc.

When the combinations reached ZZ in 2006, it was decided to extend the life of the system by incorporating the letters W and M, originally discarded due to their width. It began with WA, progressing successively to WZ, then, it was used as the second letter, starting from ZW and progressing in reverse order to KW; then the M was continued, issuing patents in reverse order from MZ to MX, whichever was the last combination issued under that system.

There is no certainty that (almost) all the combinations have been used.

The numbers start from 1000 (AA·10-00) and go up consecutively until they reach 9999 (AA·'99-99).

All the license plates bear the word CHILE at the bottom, except the bus plates of the Transantiago plan, which say TRANSANTIAGO, and the sign that separates the letters from the numbers is the isotype of said plan (square with a dark background with an arrow). Likewise, all patents have the phrase REGISTRO CIVIL E IDENTIFICACION on their left end, forming an oval; while on the far right it reads CASA DE MONEDA DE CHILE, forming a circle in which is the emblem of the Chilean Mint. These inscriptions are embossed on the metal plate, but with no paint on them, so they are only visible up close.

The font used throughout this system is Helvetica Medium Condensed.

Current format BB-BB 10 (2007-present) 

In September of 2007 the new format began to be used, which is made up of 4 letters and 2 numbers ('BB-BB·10). This system uses 18 letters,  which are: B, C, D, F, G, H, J, K, L, P, R, S, T, V, W, X, Y, Z. The letters M, N are not used (the 2 previous ones for sure not to have combinations that are CTM, PN, WN or even FPMR (Due to its similarity with the Frente Patriótico Manuel Rodríguez), Ñ, Q ( for its resemblance to the O and the number 0), and the vowels (to avoid combinations that form words and thus bother vehicle drivers)). Although new vehicle plates use the BB·BB-10 format, the previous plates were not superseded, so the two formats currently coexist. The combination allows for a vehicle park of 9,447,840 (excluding Police, Armed Forces and Firefighters vehicles).

The numbers start at 10 for each series of letters, up to 99. The letters continue to be separated from the numbers by a simplification of the National emblem, and the 4 letters in 2 groups of 2 letters by a black circle. The design (frame and font) are the same as in the previous format.

Considering the pace of vehicle registrations before the start of the format, the numbering of these patents was expected to last around 38 to 40 years. However, due to the increase in vehicle sales, the first four initial letters (B to F) were exhausted in just 6 years, and half of the series (B to L) in just 12 years,  so it seems unlikely that the combinations will even reach 25 or 30 years, unless more letters are added to the combination (for example, increasing from 18 to 20 letters increases the number of combinations by 52%.

As in the old format, the license plates have the word CHILE included at the bottom, except for the Transantiago bus plates, which have the word TRANSANTIAGO and its corresponding isotype. Also, like the previous format, they include the signs of the Civil Registry and the Mint, with the difference that they are now printed on the plate.

In 2014, thanks to a new tender from the Chilean Mint, they change the typography on all license plates with the FE-Schrift system to avoid counterfeiting on the plates (Car-Go typography) . As a novelty, they bring an indication of the print, on the extreme left of the patent if it is on the front or back.

Trailer patents - National Land Freight Transport Registry 
According to Law 19,872, which entered into force on December 20 of 2003, trailers and semi-trailers (in addition to trucks and tractor-trailers) whose gross vehicle weight is equal to or greater than 3,860 kg. they must be registered in the National Land Freight Transport Registry, replacing the Municipal Car and Trailer Registries. Trailer and semi-trailer license plates use the same design as motor vehicle license plates, following the old format (AA 10-00) and using the full series of the letter J, notwithstanding what is established when you start using the license plate. new format (BB-BB 10) once the series is over. Only the series between JA and JP were used, being replaced by the current four-letter format identifying a hologram stamped on R (trailer) and SR (semi-trailer).

Trailers and semi-trailers with a lower gross vehicle weight continue to be registered in the municipal registries. The license plates for trailers of said registries are white, have three letters and three numbers (ABC 123) written in red, and on them indicate the commune in which they were registered. The series used are distributed geographically by commune, which could be explained by the fact that they derive from the old municipal registers of motor vehicles (until 1985).

Meanwhile, trucks and tractor-trailers registered in the National Registry of Land Freight Transport are also registered in the Registry of Motorized Vehicles, so they do not carry special patents.

Motorcycle patents 
They are small in size. They consist of 2 letters and 3 numbers (AB 123), separated by a period. Above them is the word CHILE. In reality, these combinations are registered as AB·0123, due to their reduced plate space, in which the first zero does not appear; these start numbered from 100 to 999 (that is, 01-00 to 09-99) -the digits 001 to 099 are reserved for carriages-. Lately they have completed the series with the letters I, J, M, O, Q and part of W only in the use of two-wheelers.

Each license plate contains a pair (front and rear), just like other motorized vehicles, except for Carabineros motorcycles.

As of 2014, a new format is used, that of three letters and two numbers (BBB 10) under FE-Schrift characters and the size of the plates larger than the previous ones. The combinations are identical to those of other vehicles. Like the previous one, they are documented as BBB·010 for logical reasons.

Special Formats

Provisional patents 

They are the same size as the normal ones. They have an orange background with black characters. They are made up of two letters, combination PR, followed by 3 or 4 numbers (eg: PR·064, PR·1009); the letters are separated from the numbers by a black star, and at the bottom is the inscription PROVISORIA (year) depending on the year in which it was granted (eg: PROVISORIA 2007).
They are patents used by exporters or dealers to mobilize vehicles without registering them, commonly for cars that are in testing.

Police of Chile 

In the format corresponding to the vehicle fleet of Carabineros de Chile, the combinations and/or letters are used:

They are followed by the corresponding numerical assignment which belongs only to CARABINEROS DE CHILE. Above the alphanumeric combination is the inscription CARABINEROS DE CHILE.

Firefighters 

In some fire departments of the country, those institutional plates are used under the combination CB (Fire Department), followed by one or two letters per municipality, plus a star and an identifying number. Above it is the inscription CPO. FIREFIGHTERS and the name of the corresponding municipality.

Armed Forces 

The Army license plates use the combination EJTO, plus the correlative numbering.

Diplomatic Corps 

The diplomatic corps series uses the following combinations: CD (Diplomatic Corps), CC (Consular Corps), AT (Personal Technical Assistance), CH (Honorary Consul), OI (International Organization) and PAT (Temporary Admission Permit), followed by their corresponding numbers, separated by a small star. Under this is the inscription CHILE. The first double digits identify the country or organization arranged in alphabetical order.

These are some of the countries that they represent by two first digits:

Material, colors and measurements 

The patent is a metal sheet made of aluminum with the following colors depending on the use of the vehicle (AA 10 00 and BB BB 10 formats):

 Private vehicles (AA·00·00, AA·AA·00), trailers (JA·00·00, AA·AA·00) and motorcycles (AA*000, AAA*00): white background with black letters.
 Carabineros de Chile, series M, AP, Z, B, RP, LA, AG, C and J: black background with white letters. (some of these plates are plastic, made by entities outside the Chilean Mint)
 Diplomats: Plates AT, CC, CD, OI, PAT (Transitory Access Permit), CH (Honorary Consul) blue background with white letters.
 Basic Taxi: dark orange background with black letters.
 Radiotaxi tourism: light orange background with white letters.
 Collective taxis: yellow background with black letters.
 Buses of Transantiago: white background with green letters.
 Vehicles purchased in Free Zone: red background with white letters (formats AA·10·00 and AA·AA·00, cars and trucks).
 Provisional Patents: Orange background with black characters. (PR*000 and PR*0000 from 2014)
 Firefighters: red background with black or white letters. (Some of these license plates have the format CBS*000 and below with the legend CHILE, very few pumps reached an agreement with the Fire Department of Chile, and each fire station created its own format with the name of the associated company). Example: the fire department of San Miguel and La Cisterna have their plates with the name of the fire station, above, dark red background plate and white characters). Bomba España, adopted three-digit CBS plates and the word Chile below, dark red plates with black characters.
The measurements of the license plates are 360 × 130 mm, and 145 × 120 mm for motorcycles.

Curiosities 

 The combinations that were never used in the old system, since they do not appear in the list of combinations of the Patent Validation Instructions of the Civil Registry and Identification Service were: BB, AD, AK, AY, GG, HZ, DC and VW. These were incorporated later, only for motorcycles (except GG and VW). Likewise, the only combinations, according to the same instructions, that ended in M and Q, and that used the I and the O , were: XM, XQ, DI, ZI, JO, AI , BI, BM, BO, CI, CM, CO, ' DM and C.
Despite being included in said document, the combinations JO, XM, XQ and ZI do not exist in No vehicle registered or in the records. 
 582 2-letter combinations are recorded in that instruction manual, including combinations of trailers and motorcycles.
 For 7 years, the combination EU was used only for taxis and collective taxis of all kinds, except for tourist taxis, this between 2000 and 2007. Other combinations used exclusively in smaller collective locomotion vehicles were ZC, ZG, ZZ -the latter mostly used in basic taxis-, WP and some XH and YC. For the new 4-letter, 2-digit format some combinations for these vehicles are: BC, BJ, BX, CX, DG', DK, FD, FL, GB, GP,  HG, HW, JW and the last ones have been KC, KD, KY and ' LZ.
 Since 2014, certain combinations for new system trailers and semitrailers are GR, HG, HX, JW, KD , KY and PT.
 As of 2008, most buses Transantiago (today RED) began to have exclusive serials for their new buses, these began with the combination BJFxxx (from BJFB10 to BJFZ99), then they occupied the combinations CJRxxx, the combinations FLXxxx, and the combinations GCBxxx, which is the current one. However, there are new buses that arrived in the system that were registered with whatever serials were assigned at the time. Also, there are buses of these serials that were withdrawn and are distributed to provinces and regions.
 Formerly, free zone plates had a red background and white letters, this plate configuration towards the end of 2004 began to be used on the plates of vehicles entered by free zone (Iquique and  Punta Arenas). As an annex, it can be mentioned that the combinations ZD, ZE, ZF, WL, WN and some ZZ were only assigned to plates of this category in their early days.
 The design of the patents changed in 1991, from the combination DP, the strokes of the characters became a little thinner and the stamping was regularized.
 Also switched between the MX combination (the last of the old system, except for motorcycles and J-combinations for trailers) and BB.BB-10. The new plates have the letters stamped at right angles, so the relief is flat, while in the previous plates, the relief was rounded. As of the font change, the current string is maintained, starting the combination GK.
From the PX combination, a little more thickness is observed in the letter together with a hologram-type stamp on them, which are reflected through light.
 This system is similar to those used in Netherlands (NL).

References

Chile
Road transport in Chile
 Registration plates